The 2015 LA Galaxy II season was the club's second season of existence. This season LA Galaxy II participated in the USL and the U.S. Open Cup.

Players

Squad information

Transfers

Transfers in

Transfers out

Competitions

USL

Standings

Results summary

Regular season 

All times in Eastern Time.

Playoffs

First round

Conference semifinal

Conference final

USL Championship

U.S. Open Cup 

All times in Pacific Time.

Second round 
Draw held on April 8.

Champions Soccer LLC International Soccer Challenge

See also 
 2015 in American soccer
 2015 LA Galaxy season

References

External links 
 

LA Galaxy II seasons
LA Galaxy II
LA Galaxy II
LA Galaxy II